Anolis anoriensis is a species of lizard in the family Dactyloidae. The species is found in Colombia.

References

Anoles
Reptiles of Colombia
Endemic fauna of Colombia
Reptiles described in 2010
Taxa named by Hobart Muir Smith
Taxa named by Thomas H. Fritts